Donkey's Tail (Romanized: Osliniy khvost) was a Russian artistic group created from the most radical members of the Jack of Diamonds group. The group included such painters as: Mikhail Larionov (inventor of the name), Natalia Goncharova, Kazimir Malevich, Marc Chagall, and Aleksandr Shevchenko. The group, according to Gino Severini in his autobiography, was Futurist; it is known that, even if they were not, they were certainly influenced by the Cubo-Futurism movement. The only exhibition of the group took place in Moscow in 1912 (notable for being the start of Malevich's entry into his Cubo-Futurist phase), and in 1913, the group fell apart.

Gallery

References

Bibliography
 Voloshin Лики творчества (Faces of creativity) - Leningrad: Nauka, 1988. - pp. 287–289.
 Pospelov, G. Бубновый валет (Jack of Diamonds) - Moscow: Soviet artist, 1990. -  .

Russian art movements
Russian artist groups and collectives
Modern artists
Russian avant-garde